Zoma can refer to:

 Zoma, an antagonist character in Dragon Warrior III, a console role-playing game
 La Zoma, a town in the province of Teruel, Aragón, Spain
 Zoma (spider), a genus of ray spider (family Theridiosomatidae)